The 2019–20 Israeli Basketball State Cup was the 60th edition of the Israeli Basketball State Cup, organized by the Israel Basketball Association.

The Final Four of the tournament was held from February 10–13 in the Menora Mivtachim Arena in Tel Aviv.

On February 13, 2020, Hapoel Jerusalem won its sixth State Cup title after a 92–89 win over Ironi Nahariya in the Final. J'Covan Brown was named the Final MVP.

First round
Hapoel Jerusalem, Maccabi Rishon LeZion, Hapoel Holon, Hapoel Tel Aviv, Maccabi Tel Aviv and Hapoel Be'er Sheva were pre-qualified for the Round of 16 and did not have to play in the first round.

On October 22, 2019, Kevin Capers made an Israeli State Cup-record by scoring 57 points for Hapoel Ramat Gan Givatayim in a 94–104 loss to Hapoel Haifa, passing Tony Dawson’s previous record of 55 points in 1992.

H. Hevel Modi'in  vs. I. Nes Ziona

A.S. Ramat HaSharon vs. E. Yavne

B. Herzliya vs. M. Ra'anana

M. Kiryat Motzkin vs. H. Galil Elyon

E. Ashkelon vs. H. Gilboa Galil

M. Hod HaSharon vs. M. Haifa

H. Ramat Gan Givatayim vs. H. Haifa

E. Netanya vs. I. Nahariya

I. Kiryat Ata vs. M. Ashdod

H. Afula vs. H. Eilat

Round of 16

H. Galil Elyon vs. I. Nahariya

H. Eilat vs. M. Tel Aviv

E. Yavne vs. M. Rishon LeZion

I. Nes Ziona vs. M. Ashdod

B. Herzliya vs. M. Haifa

H. Haifa. vs. H. Gilboa Galil

H. Be'er Sheva vs. H. Holon

H. Jerusalem vs. H. Tel Aviv

Quarterfinals

H. Holon vs. I. Nahariya

I. Nes Ziona vs. H. Gilboa Galil

B. Herzliya vs. M. Rishon LeZion

M. Tel Aviv vs. H. Jerusalem

Final Four

Bracket

Semifinals

Final

See also
2019–20 Israeli Basketball Premier League

References

2019
Cup